Fedee may refer to:
Dominic Fedee, a Saint Lucian politician
Sergio Fedee, a Saint Lucian cricketer
Federation of International Employers or FedEE

See also
Feedee, the person being fed in fat fetishism